Mashiur Rahman (25 June 1953 – 1 November 2022) was a Bangladeshi independence activist and Bangladesh Nationalist Party politician who served as a Member of Parliament of Jhenaidah-2.

Career
Rahman was elected to parliament from Jhenaidah-2 as a Bangladesh Nationalist Party candidate in 1991, 1996, and 2001. He was the President of Jhenaidah District unit of Bangladesh Nationalist Party. In 2017, he was sentenced to ten years imprisonment by a Jhenaidah District court for concealing information about his wealth.

Personal life and death
Rahman died from heart attack at his Jhenaidah residence, on 1 November 2022, at the age of 69.

References

1953 births
2022 deaths
Bangladesh Nationalist Party politicians
5th Jatiya Sangsad members
6th Jatiya Sangsad members
7th Jatiya Sangsad members
8th Jatiya Sangsad members
People from Jhenaidah District